The 1994 Las Vegas Posse season was the first and only season in the team's franchise history. They finished last place in the West division with a 5–13 record and failed to make the playoffs. It marked the only season with which the team would play; the organization became insolvent and was subsequently dissolved at the conclusion of the season. Anthony Calvillo was the last member on the active roster for the Las Vegas Posse to have played in the Canadian Football League (CFL) at the time of his retirement in January 2014 after the 2013 CFL season had ended two months prior.

Preseason

Regular season

Season standings

Season schedule

 (*) Due to low attendance numbers, the final home game of the season was moved to Commonwealth Stadium in Edmonton, Alberta.

Roster

 Andre Allen
 Zock Allen
 Steve Anderson
 Tyler Anderson
 Tom Backes
 Wolf Barber
 Greg Battle
 Jessie Becton
 James Blake
 Anthony Blue
 Tim Broady
 Leon Brown
 James Bullock
 Alfie Burch
 Anthony Calvillo
 Glen Cavanaugh
 Robert Claiborne
 Michael Clark
 David Clarke
 Darrell Corbin
 Cedrick Crawford
 Jeff Cummins
 Keith Embray
 Michael Esser
 Judd Garrett
 Joe Garten
 Eric Geter
 Craig Gibson
 Garrett Greedy
 Darian Hagan
 Kalin Hall
 Kelvin Harris
 Carl Harry
 Roy Hart
 Haywood Haynes
 James Hill
 David Hollis
 Brandon Houston
 Carlos Huerta
 Ben Jefferson
 Duane Johnson
 Lance Johnson
 Leonard Johnson
 Claude Jones
 Preston Jones
 Alfred Jordan
 Robbie Keen
 Jake Kelchner
 Maurice Kelly
 Bob Kronenberg
Casey Kupisch 
 Brad Lacombe
 David Maeva
 Curtis Mayfield
 Russ McCullough
 Jason Medlock
 John Nee
 Calvin Nicholson
 Shonte Peoples
 James Richards
 Don Robinson
 Zedrick Robinson
 Jeff Sawyer
 Rusty Setzer
 Lamark Shackerford
 Ron Shipley
 Dan Sileo
 Nicholas Smith
 Michael Stephens
 Aubrey Thompson
 Greg Tucker
 Tamarick Vanover
 Jon Volpe
 Jon Wauford
 Marc Weekly
 Allen Whiting
 Len Williams
 Prince Wimbley
 Torrey Wright
 Will Wrights

 Head coach: Ron Meyer

References

Las Vegas Posse
Canadian Football League seasons
Las Veg